Bhaktavatsalu Naidu was an Indian politician and former Member of the Legislative Assembly of Tamil Nadu. He was elected to the Tamil Nadu legislative assembly as an Independent candidate from Arakkonam constituency in 1952 election.

References 

Tamil Nadu politicians
Madras MLAs 1952–1957